Duke of Béjar is a hereditary title in the Peerage of Spain, accompanied by the dignity of Grandee and granted in 1485 by the Catholic Monarchs to Álvaro de Zúñiga, 1st Duke of Plasencia and chief justice of Castile.

The title refers to the town of Béjar in Salamanca, Spain.

Dukes of Béjar (1485)

Álvaro de Zúñiga y Guzmán, 1st Duke of Béjar
Álvaro de Zúñiga y Pérez de Guzmán, 2nd Duke of Béjar
Teresa de Zúñiga y Manrique de Lara, 3rd Duchess of Béjar
Francisco de Zúñiga y Sotomayor, 4th Duke of Béjar
Francisco Diego de Zúñiga y Mendoza, 5th Duke of Béjar
Alfonso Diego de Zúñiga y Pérez de Guzmán, 6th Duke of Béjar
Francisco Diego de Zúñiga y Mendoza, 7th Duke of Béjar
Alfonso Diego de Zúñiga y Mendoza, 8th Duke of Béjar
Juan Manuel de Zúñiga y Mendoza, 9th Duke of Béjar
Manuel Diego López de Zúñiga y Sarmiento de Silva, 10th Duke of Béjar
Juan Manuel López de Zúñiga y Castro, 11th Duke of Béjar, 11th Duke of Béjar
Joaquín López de Zúñiga y Castro, 12th Duke of Béjar
María Josefa Alfonso-Pimentel y Téllez-Girón, 13th Duchess of Béjar
Pedro de Alcántara Téllez-Girón y Beaufort Spontin, 14th Duke of Béjar
Mariano Téllez-Girón y Beaufort Spontin, 15th Duke of Béjar
María del Rosario Téllez-Girón y Fernández de Velasco, 16th Duchess of Béjar
Jaime Roca de Togores y Téllez-Girón, 17th duke of Béjar
Luis de Alcántara Roca de Togores y Téllez-Girón, 18th Duke of Béjar
Pedro de Álcantara Roca de Togores y Tordesillas, 19th Duke of Béjar
Pedro de Álcantara Roca de Togores y Laffitte, 20th Duke of Béjar
Pedro de Álcantara Roca de Togores y Salinas, 21st Duke of Béjar

See also
List of dukes in the peerage of Spain
List of current Grandees of Spain

References 

Dukedoms of Spain
Grandees of Spain
Lists of dukes
Lists of Spanish nobility